Polyipnus polli, commonly known as the round hatchetfish, is a species of ray-finned fish in the family Sternoptychidae.

Etymology
The fish is named in honor of Max Poll (1908-1991), a Belgian ichthyologist, who loaned specimens of this species to Schultz.

Status
Polyipnus polli is a common species within its known range and faces no particular threats. For these reasons, the International Union for Conservation of Nature has assessed its conservation status as being of "least concern".

References

Sternoptychidae
Taxa named by Leonard Peter Schultz
Fish described in 1961